
Gmina Zator is an urban-rural gmina (administrative district) in Oświęcim County, Lesser Poland Voivodeship, in southern Poland.

Villages
Apart from the town of Zator, Gmina Zator contains the villages and settlements of Graboszyce, Grodzisko, Laskowa, Łowiczki, Palczowice, Podolsze, Rudze, Smolice and Trzebieńczyce.

Neighbouring gminas
Gmina Zator is bordered by the gminas of Alwernia, Babice, Przeciszów, Spytkowice, Tomice and Wieprz.

References
Polish official population figures 2006

Zator
Oświęcim County